is a Japanese expressway in Kyushu that travels from Tosu to  Hiji, where it connects to the Higashikyushu Expressway. It runs through the southern half of Fukuoka Prefecture, and the northern half of Ōita Prefecture.

History
 February 5, 1987, the Tosu Junction to Asakura Interchange was opened.
 July 20, 1989, a section from Yufuin to Beppu Interchanges was opened to traffic.
 March 10, 1990, a section from Asakura to Hita Interchanges was opened to traffic. 
 December 3, 1992, a section from Beppu to Ōita Interchanges was opened to traffic. 
 December 15, 1994, a section from Hiji Junction to Hayami Interchange was opened to traffic.
 March 10, 1995, a section from Hita to Kusu Interchanges was opened to traffic. 
 March 28, 1996, a section from Kusu to Yufuin Interchanges was opened to traffic.  
 November 26, 1996, a section from Ōita to Ōita Mera Interchanges was opened to traffic which made the Ōita Expressway from Tosu to Ōita fully accessible with no gaps. 
 November 11, 1998, a section from Haki to Hita Interchanges which made Ōita Expressway with four lanes. 
 November 27, 1999, the Ōita Mera Interchange to the east was opened to traffic.
 March 21, 2000, a section from Hita to Kusu Interchanges which made with four lanes.
 March 30, 2002, a section from Hayami Interchange to the east was opened with other freeway.
 May 25, 2002, a section from Yufuin Interchange to Hiji Junction which made with four lanes.
 August 30, 2004, a section from Mizuwake Parking Area to Yufuin Interchange which made with four lanes.
 March 19, 2005, a section from Kusu Interchange to Mizuwake Parking Area which made Ōita Expressway from Tosu to Ōita with four lanes now being connected with no gaps.
 August 11, 2008, the Ōita Mitsuyoshi Interchange was fully accessible.
 August 5, 2018, a section from Hiji Junction to Ōita Mera Interchange is incorporated as part of the Higashikyushu Expressway.

Interchanges 

 IC - interchange, JCT - junction, SA - service area, PA - parking area, BS - bus stop, TN - tunnel, BR - bridge, TB - toll gate
 Bus stops labeled "○" are currently in use; those marked "◆" are closed.

Lanes

 4-lane

References

Expressways in Japan
Kyushu region
Roads in Fukuoka Prefecture
Roads in Ōita Prefecture
Roads in Saga Prefecture